Whareama is a rural area in the Wellington Region of New Zealand's North Island. The Whareama River flows through the area.

Marae

The community has two marae affiliated with the Ngāti Kahungunu hapū of Ngāi Tumapuhia-a-Rangi: Motuwairaka Marae, which lost its meeting house to fire in 2017, and Ngāi Tumapuhia a Rangi ki Okautete Marae, which is still constructing its meeting house by 2020.

In October 2020, the Government committed $2,179,654 from the Provincial Growth Fund to upgrade both marae, alongside Pāpāwai, Kohunui, Hurunui o Rangi and Te Oreore marae. Together, the upgrades were expected to create 19.8 full time jobs.

Demographics 

Whareama had a population of 1,410 at the 2018 New Zealand census, an increase of 129 people (10.1%) since the 2013 census, and an increase of 120 people (9.3%) since the 2006 census. There were 555 households. There were 729 males and 681 females, giving a sex ratio of 1.07 males per female. The median age was 43.6 years (compared with 37.4 years nationally), with 291 people (20.6%) aged under 15 years, 204 (14.5%) aged 15 to 29, 726 (51.5%) aged 30 to 64, and 189 (13.4%) aged 65 or older.

Ethnicities were 93.0% European/Pākehā, 17.4% Māori, 1.7% Pacific peoples, 0.6% Asian, and 1.1% other ethnicities (totals add to more than 100% since people could identify with multiple ethnicities).

The proportion of people born overseas was 10.0%, compared with 27.1% nationally.

Although some people objected to giving their religion, 56.0% had no religion, 35.5% were Christian, 0.2% were Buddhist and 1.9% had other religions.

Of those at least 15 years old, 192 (17.2%) people had a bachelor or higher degree, and 204 (18.2%) people had no formal qualifications. The median income was $34,000, compared with $31,800 nationally. The employment status of those at least 15 was that 612 (54.7%) people were employed full-time, 231 (20.6%) were part-time, and 30 (2.7%) were unemployed.

Education

References

Masterton District
Populated places in the Wellington Region